Pororo the Little Penguin is a South Korean computer-animated television series. The series premiered on EBS 1 in South Korea in 2003 and ran on the channel until 2021. The series had 7 seasons.

The series revolves around the adventures of a little penguin named Pororo, and his friends who live in the snowy hamlet of Porong Porong Forest, who often encounter challenges and learn practical and moral lessons in each episode.

Production 

It was created in 2003 Iconix Entertainment Co., Ltd, a company based in Seoul, South Korea. Choi Sang-hyun, who was working at Iconix Entertainment, was given a project of creating a character that represents an animal living in the winter. Choi visited a zoo in order to see those animals and understand how children enjoyed watching them.

Several professional designers joined the project to come up with a character, but Choi's design was chosen as the winner, which then became Pororo. The original Pororo was a blue and white, petite penguin sporting an aviator helmet and goggles, which became popular among children. When it was introduced, it targeted children aged 4–7.

Pororo has no specific background or cultural coding, so that the series could be popular to children worldwide. Pororo's design inspirations include iconic mascots Mickey Mouse and Hello Kitty. The creators picked the colours blue, pink and white to ensure familiarity for children, as well as representing said colors for boys and girls.

When making episodes, producers focused to details that could be biased to certain cultural codes or give a historical reference, that is sensitive to viewers in certain parts of the world. For example, they ensured that the characters wave rather than bowing or nodding to each other. In the second season, the characters were all given redesigns and outfits that correspond to their personalities.

Characters 

English credits:
 English translation: Ani100
 English voice director: Anna Paik

English cast:
 Bommie Catherine Han: Pororo, Monkey 1
 Anna Desmarais: Eddy, Petty
 Nancy Kim: Harry, Monkey 3
 Anna Paik: Loopy, Tutu, Monkey 2
 Matt Anipen: Poby, Narrator, Wall Clock
 Josh Schwartzentruber: Rody, Fuzzy Wuzzy
 John Lee: Tong-tong, Yeti

Broadcast
The series premiered on EBS 1 in South Korea in 2003, until 2021.

In the USA, the show was dubbed in Spanish and aired on V-me in the late 2000s and currently aired on V-me Kids.

On October 5, 2015, it was broadcast in Brazil through TV Cultura and later on October 12 through TV Rá-Tim-Bum.

In Italy, the show aired on Rai 2.

In 2010, the series was purchased by the NPO for Zappelin in the Netherlands.

In Poland, the show was aired on MiniMini+ under the title "Mały pingwinek Popolo".

In Japan, the first season aired on Fuji TV, but other three aired on Disney Junior.

In Southeast Asia, the series aired on Disney Junior.

Media

Seasons

Aspect ratio:
Season 1: 52 x 5' (2003-2004)
Season 2: 52 x 5' (2005-2006)
Season 3: 52 x 5' (2009)
Season 4: 26 x 11' (2012)
Season 5: 26 x 11' (2014)
Season 6: 26 x 11' (2016)
Season 1 (revival): 52 x 5' (2017)
Season 7: 26 x 11 (2020-2021)

Films and Bonus
Pororo, to the Cookie Castle (2004)
Pororo, Fort Boyard Adventure (2010)
Pororo, Who Wants to be a Millionaire Adventure (2011)
Pororo, The Voice Adventure (2012)
Pororo, The Racing Adventure (2013)
Pororo, Snow Fairy Adventure (2014)
Pororo: Cyberspace Adventure (2015)
Pororo: Racing Space Adventure (2016)
Pororo, Dinosaur World Adventure (2017)
Pororo, Dragon World Adventure (2018)
Pororo, Treasure Island Adventure (2019)
Pororo, City Island Adventure (2020)
Pororo, Car World Adventure (2021)
Pororo, Dragon Castle Adventure (2022)
Pororo, Dinosaur Castle Adventure (2023)

Others

Spin-offs
Pororo Sing-A-Long: 14 x 3' (2006)
Eddy The Clever Fox: 13 x 5' (2010)
Loopy, The Cooking Princess: 6 x 5' (2012)
Pororo's English Show: 13 x 5' (2013)
Pororo's Adventure to Korea: 13 x 5' (2016)

Shorts
Netflix New Year's Eve Countdown 2018 (2017)

Reception and legacy 
Initially, Pororo was created solely for entertainment. Later, parents suggested to Choi Jung-il of Iconix Entertainment that new episodes with educational value be included. Producers have received many requests, ranging from what the characters should eat and how to play in episodes to what they can do for society.

Korean Air also provides Pororo-related merchandise for children including a doodle book, a colouring book and a plush toy of the character. In 2015, Pororo was chosen as the mascot for mass transportation in Seoul.

In the summer of 2016, a Pororo theme park opened at Seoul COEX Mall featuring rides and a parade of Pororo characters.

Awards and nominations 
In 2007, Pororo received numerous awards from the South Korean government, including the award by the Ministry of Culture and Tourism. In 2010, Pororo got the president's award for Best Animated Characters. In 2014, Pororo got the award for Creative Brands.

References

External links 
 Iconix Official Website 
 Pororo the Little Penguin Official Site
 Pororo the Little Penguin Official EBS Website 
 Pororo in Netherlands 
 OCON Studios
  IMDB page for Pororo the Little Penguin TV series.

2003 South Korean television series debuts
2000s South Korean animated television series
2010s South Korean animated television series
2020s South Korean animated television series
South Korean children's animated television series
Computer-animated television series
Animated television series about children
Animated television series about penguins
Animated preschool education television series
2000s preschool education television series
2010s preschool education television series
2020s preschool education television series
Fictional aviators
Korean-language television shows
English-language television shows
Boomerang (TV network) original programming
Cartoonito original programming